APM Terminals is a port operating company headquartered in The Hague, Netherlands. A unit of Danish shipping company Maersk's Transport and Logistics division, it  manages terminals and provides integrated cargo and inland services. It operates 74 port and terminal facilities in 40 countries on five continents, with five new port projects in development, in addition to over 100 inland services operations providing container transportation, management, maintenance and repair in 38 countries, for an overall global presence of 58 countries. In 2018, APM Terminals was ranked the world's fifth largest container terminal operator.

Overview
APM Terminals reported revenue of US$4.1 billion for 2017 on a consolidated basis, on par with 2016, but with underlying volume growth on an equity-weighted basis of 6.5%. Portfolio container volume amounted to 39.7 million TEUs (37.3 million TEUs) on an equity-weighted basis, 6.5% higher than in 2016, following strong volumes in north Asia, Latin America and across several locations due to strong growth from Maersk Line. APM Terminals’ equity-weighted volume growth was slightly higher than the estimated global port throughput growth in 2017 of 6%. Adjusted for newly commenced entities and divested terminals, volume increased by 5%. Invested capital increased to US$8.1 billion ($8 billion) mainly due to capital investment in projects under implementation, partially offset by impairment and capital discipline.

Three new terminals commenced operation in 2017 (Lázaro Cárdenas, Mexico, Izmir, Turkey and Quetzal, Guatemala), while APM Terminals divested one inland service, Pentalver, UK, as well as two terminals, Zeebrugge, Belgium, and Dalian, China. Moreover, APM Terminals Tacoma, USA, ended operations in September. APM Terminals Lázaro Cárdenas, Mexico, Latin America's largest semi-automated terminal, commenced operations in April. The terminal has the capacity to receive the world's largest ships. With the first phase of the terminal complete, APM Terminals Lázaro Cárdenas occupies an area of 49 hectares, with a 750-metre-long quay and an annual capacity of 1.2m TEU. As part of APM Terminals’ strategy
implementation and portfolio optimisation, APM Terminals completed in 2017 the divestment of its 100% stake in Pentalver, the UK-based provider of container transport and
other container-related services, its 51% stake in Zeebrugge, Belgium, with 1.3m TEU annual capacity and its 20% stake in Dalian, China, with 2.3m TEU annual capacity. APM
Terminals Tacoma, USA, ended operations at the end of September as part of its portfolio optimisation plans, and transferred its concession to SSA Marine. APM Terminals’ portfolio of inland services has been growing its presence with six new locations, including the opening of a container depot in Sullana, Peru. Sullana is one of the largest areas for grapes production as well as for growing organic bananas and mangos.

Financial Performance
Operating business reported a loss of $146 million (profit of $487 million), negatively impacted by impairments in challenging markets, while projects under implementation realised a loss of $23 million (loss of $49 million) stemming from start-up costs. The share of profit/loss in joint ventures and associated companies was a loss of $52 million (profit of 
$193 million). Excluding the impact of impairments, the result from joint ventures and associated companies was a profit of $212 million, $19 million higher than in 2016. Tax decreased to $53 million ($149 million), mainly due to prior-year adjustments, the rate of exchange impact on deferred tax and a reduced tax rate in the USA following changes in legislation. Cash flow from operating activities was $827 million ($819 million). Cash flow used for capital expenditure was $672 million ($1.5 billion), of which $490 million related to terminal implementation projects. The capital expenditure in 2016 was mainly due to the acquisition of the Spanish Grup Marítim TCB's port and rail interests. APM Terminals generated a positive
free cash flow of $155 million (negative $730 million). Invested capital increased to $8.1 billion ($8.0 billion), mainly due to capital investment in projects under implementation, partially offset by impairment and capital discipline.

History 
The company's history in terminal operations began a half century ago with the first A.P. Moller facility, which opened in Brooklyn, in the Port of New York in 1958 to handle general cargoes. In 1975 the group established the Port Authority of New York and New Jersey's first dedicated container terminal, at Berth 51 at Port Elizabeth, New Jersey.

APM Terminals was founded as the port and terminal operating unit of Copenhagen, Denmark-based Maersk Group in January 2001. In 2004, APM Terminals moved its headquarters from Copenhagen to The Hague, Netherlands. Today the company provides services to more than 60 shipping lines with an integrated global port, terminal and inland services network with interests in 74 operating port facilities, with five in development, and over 100 cargo support service operations representing a global presence in 58 countries on five continents.

Business Operations 
 Three new terminals commenced operation in 2017: APM Terminals Lázaro Cárdenas (Mexico); APM Terminals Izmir, Turkey; and APM Terminals Quetzal, Guatemala.
 In March 2016 APM Terminals completed the $1 billion acquisition of Spanish-based Grup Maritim TCB's port and rail interests. The acquisition added 8 terminals with a combined 2 million TEU equity-weighted volumes to the APM Terminals Global Terminal Network. 
 Meridian Port Services, a joint venture between APM Terminals, Bolloré Africa Logistics, and the Ghana Ports and Harbours Authority, have formalized an agreement invest $1.5 billion in new deep-water 3.5 million TEU port and logistics hub in Tema, Ghana.
 Sogester Namibe, an APM Terminals joint venture, signed a 20-year concession to operate, maintain and develop the Port of Moçâmedes in southern Angola, in May 2014. Sogester Container Terminal has been operating at Port of Luanda, the primary port of Angola, since 2007.
 Global Ports, Russia's largest terminal operating company, in which APM Terminals holds a co-controlling share, completed the acquisition of NCC, Russia's second-largest terminal operating company in December 2013.
 In February 2013 APM Terminals and Turkish-based Petkim announced the finalization of plans to develop APM Terminals Izmir near the Port of Izmir, Turkey. The 15.5 meter deep facility opened in 2016 under a 28-year concession, with an initial annual throughput capacity of 1.5 million TEUs.

Recent Awards 
2017
GE SSA Transportation "Strategic Partner of the Year"
APM Terminals was named winner of the GE Sub-Saharan Africa Transportation “Strategic Partner of the Year” Award in September 2017, for participation in the Nigerian rail infrastructure improvement consortium.

State of Alabama Trade Excellence Award
APM Terminals Mobile was one of eight Alabama businesses to be honored by Alabama Governor Robert Bentley for their achievements in promoting and facilitating the export goods and services from Alabama across the globe.

Global Ports Forum “Best Terminal in South Asia”
South Asia Gateway Terminals, at the Port of Colombo, Sri Lanka, was named “Best Terminal in South Asia” by the Global Ports Forum. APM Terminals holds a 33% share in SAGT. 
 
2016
ICHCA International Safety Innovation Award
APM Terminals Buenos Aires, operator of the Terminal 4 facility in Argentina's primary port, was named winner of the first annual “Innovation in Safety Award”, by ICHCA International, the independent organization dedicated to improving the safety, productivity and efficiency of cargo handling and transportation.
 
2015
Lloyd's List North American Maritime “Port Operator Award”
APM Terminals was named winner of the 2015 “Port Operator Award” at the Lloyd's List North American Maritime Awards, in Houston, Texas.

Containerisation International “Innovation of the Year” Award
APM Terminals Rotterdam Maasvlakte II was named winner of the Containerisation International 2015 “Innovation of the Year” Award at the Annual Containerisation International Awards luncheon, in London.

All India Maritime & Logistics Awards “Container Terminal of the Year” 
APM Terminals Mumbai, was once again named winner of the All India Maritime & Logistics Awards “Container Terminal of the Year” Award”.

Lloyd's List Middle East and Indian Subcontinent Awards “Logistics Award” 
APM Terminals Inland Services India was named winner of the Lloyd's List Middle East and Indian Subcontinent Awards “Logistics Award”.

Pacific Maritime Association Safety Awards 
APM Terminals Pier 400 Los Angeles won two awards at the 66th Annual Pacific Maritime Association (PMA) Area Accident Prevention Committee Safety Awards for 2014. The first award was the PMA Coast Accident Prevention Awards ceremony in the category of Terminal Operations, Group A, (over one million man-hours worked) for the best Safety Performance achieved in 2014 in all operations at US West Coast ports. This is the sixth year out of the last eight that APM Terminals’ Los Angeles facility has received this award. APM Terminals Pier 400 also won the Southern California Area Container Terminal Safety Award for Group A category terminals.

Nigerian Port Authority “Most Environmentally Conscious Port Operator”
APM Terminals Apapa named the “Most Environmentally Conscious Port Operator at the Lagos Port Complex” by the Nigerian Port Authority's Environment Department of the Health, Safety and Environment Division, in recognition of the company's achievements in the area of terminal safety culture and operating practices in Nigeria's primary port city.

2014
CII 2013 Environment, Health, and Safety Excellence Award
APM Terminals India's Chennai CFS facility was named winner of the 2013 Environment, Health, and Safety (EHS) Excellence Award by the Confederation of Indian Industry (CII) for the implementation of EHS Best Practices.

*Excellence in Inland Container Logistics" Award
APM Terminals Inland Services South Asia was named winner of the “Excellence in Inland Container Logistics for Manufacturing Sector” award at the 3rd Annual Asia Manufacturing and Supply Chain Awards, presented at the Asia Manufacturing Supply Chain Summit in Mumbai.

2013

Lloyd's List Asia Awards 2013 “Port Operator Award” 
APM Terminals was named winner of the Lloyd's List Asia Awards 2013 “Port Operator Award” in recognition of maintaining “the highest standards of operational efficiency and customer service throughout the year” among port and terminal operators in the Far East.

Containerisation International 2013 “International Terminal Operator of the Year”
APM Terminals was once again named “International Terminal Operator of the Year” at the Containerisation International 2013 Awards, for the second consecutive year. APM Terminals’ “ongoing investment programs at its terminals and its ability to implement and adapt very effectively global safety, security and environmental guidelines at the local level” were cited by the judging panel in the win, as well as APM Terminals’ Global Terminal Network's “success in combining development with continuous improvements in its CSR and environmental policies”.

“Best Inland Services Provider” (APM Terminals India)
APM Terminals India Pvt. Ltd. was named “Best Inland Services Provider” for 2013 at the 7th Annual Express, Logistics & Supply Chain Leadership Awards in Mumbai, India in September, in the “Service Excellence” category of the program.

“Container Terminal Operator of the Year” (APM Terminals Mumbai)
APM Terminals Mumbai was named “Container Terminal Operator of the Year (Specific)” for 2013 at the 4th Annual All-India Maritime and Logistics Awards (MALA) on September 6, in Mumbai. The award was presented on the basis of operational performance, year-on-year volume growth, IT efficiency, the use of advanced technology, and customer satisfaction.

“Container Terminal Operator of the Year- Health, Safety and Quality Award” (APM Terminals Pipavav)
APM Terminals Pipavav was named winner of the “Port/Terminal Operator of the Year- Health, Safety and Quality Award” for 2013 at the 4th Annual All-India Maritime and Logistics Awards (MALA). The criteria for the award include facility investment in health and safety measures, and external industry certification.

“Container Freight Station of the Year-Private” (Chennai CFS)
APM Terminals India's Chennai CFS was named co-winner of the 2013 Container Freight Station of the Year Award-(Private) at the 5th Annual Exim India South East Cargo & Logistics Awards, held in Chennai, India on July 19. The award recognizes APM Terminals Chennai's efforts in promoting trade through creation of modern facilities and infrastructure, and the achievement of high standards of efficiency and productivity during 2012.

“Container Freight Station of the Year-Private” (Chennai CFS)
APM Terminals India's Chennai CFS was named co-winner of the 2013 Container Freight Station of the Year Award-(Private) at the 5th Annual Exim India South East Cargo & Logistics Awards, held in Chennai, India on July 19. The award recognizes APM Terminals Chennai's efforts in promoting trade through creation of modern facilities and infrastructure, and the achievement of high standards of efficiency and productivity during 2012.

Supplier Appreciation Award (APM Terminals Mumbai CFS)
APM Terminals Inland Services Mumbai Container Freight Station (CFS) was selected by Volkswagen India to receive its annual “Supplier Appreciation Award” for excellent performance during 2011-2012. The award is in recognition of the Inland Services operation's help in achieving Volkswagen's targeted logistics chain performance levels for the 110,000 vehicle capacity Chakan auto manufacturing facility near Pune, in the State of Maharashtra.

National Quality Award (Morocco)
APM Terminals Tangier was named winner of the 2012 National Quality Award organized by Morocco's Ministry of Industry, Trade and New Technologies. This 15th annual Quality Award ceremony was held in the Moroccan capital of Rabat, with the participation of the Moroccan Union for Quality (UMAQ). The mission of the UMAQ includes the responsibility to “promote the quality of goods and services in all sectors of the national economy”.

“Best Employer” Award (Morocco)
APM Terminals Tangier was named “Best Employer in Morocco” on January 21 at the second annual Best Employer Award sponsored by business consultant Lycom in collaboration with Morocco's Ministry of Education and Professional Training, the Global Confederation of Moroccan Companies (CGEM), and the American Chamber of Commerce in Morocco, and the Best Companies Group.

Current New Terminal Development or Existing Facility Expansion Projects Include
New Developments
Moín Container Terminal, Costa Rica
Tema, Ghana
Abidjan, Ivory Coast
Vado Ligure, Italy
Tangier, Morocco
Rijeka Gateway, Croatia

Expansions and Upgrades of Existing Facilities Include
Cartagena, Colombia
Gothenburg, Sweden
Los Angeles, California
Mobile, Alabama
Onne, Nigeria
Port Elizabeth, New Jersey
Poti, Republic of Georgia
Qingdao, China
Tanjung Pelepas, Malaysia
Tema, Ghana

Sustainability
APM Terminals’ sustainability initiatives and performance are divided into four core areas: Health, Safety and Security; Environment; Responsible Business; and Social Responsibility. Significant gains or new major initiatives have been achieved or implemented in each performance category.

There were 141 Lost-Time Injuries (LTI) recorded in the APM Terminals operating portfolio in 2017. This was the lowest number of LTI ever achieved by APM Terminals. The LTI frequency rate (LTIF) for the year was 1.62 per million man-hours worked, slight higher than the 1.52 recorded in 2016. There were also three fatalities at APM Terminals facilities during the year. A new incident reporting tool was launched across all APM Terminals locations globally in fourth quarter of 2017. The new tool greatly improves our ability to analyze our data and gain more insight into eliminating risk by utilizing data-driven decisions on where to focus attention going forward. 

In 2018, we continue to work to improve our environmental performance specifically and to develop global environmental standards and guidelines. In the area of greenhouse gases and other emissions, APM Terminals has set a goal of a 25% reduction in  output, as measured from the base year of 2010. APM Terminals signed a two-year, €5 million ($6.23 million) contract with Amsterdam-based NV Nuon Energy for the supply of environmentally sustainable wind-generated electricity to power the new APM Terminals Maasvlakte II cranes and container handling equipment. The new deep-water terminal, which was officially inaugurated in April 2015, is the world's first container terminal to generate zero greenhouse gases and particulate emissions as compared with diesel-powered terminal machinery. The contract term began on January 1, 2015.

APM Terminals has embarked on a program to convert and retrofit more than 400 Rubber-Tire Gantry Cranes (RTGs) in use throughout the APM Terminals global port, terminal and inland services network to a combination electric and diesel power as a measure to reduce both costs and emission of carbon dioxide from the current diesel-powered RTG fleet. 
RTGs, which are used to move loaded and unloaded containers at the terminals, are usually powered by diesel engines. The new power supply will be a combination of electricity and diesel, utilizing a busbar- a rail providing access to electrical power. Recent technological advances have made such a hybrid power option possible for RTGs.
The use of E-RTGs will reduce  emissions by between 60-80% compared with conventional diesel-powered RTGs, which will result in overall terminal  emissions decreasing by 20% per TEU handled. The retro-fitting of the majority of the existing 400 unit APM Terminals RTG fleet will eliminate 70,000 tons of  emissions annually.

See also 
 Containerization
 Dock (maritime)

References

External links
 Official site

 
Multinational companies headquartered in the Netherlands
Container shipping companies of Denmark
Transport companies established in 2001
Port operating companies
Companies based in The Hague